Rockwall Independent School District is a public school district based in Rockwall, Texas (USA).

In addition to Rockwall, the district serves the cities of Heath, McLendon-Chisholm, Mobile City, most of Fate, and small portions of Rowlett, Wylie, Garland, and Dallas in Rockwall County. The district also extends into a very small portion of northern Kaufman County, including sections of Heath and Travis Ranch. A very small section extends to Collin County.

In 2009, the school district was rated "academically acceptable" by the Texas Education Agency.

Core Values for Rockwall ISD include: Relationships, Innovation, and Excellence.

History

Rockwall ISD was established in 1841. In 2012 the district had 14,427 students, and in 2013 it had a budget of $100 million and over 1,500 employees.  By 2018 the district has grown to 16,270 students, 2,268 employees and still operated on a budget of $100 million.

Schools

High schools
 Grades 9-12
Rockwall High School
Rockwall-Heath High School

Middle schools
Grades 7-8
Maurine Cain Middle
J.W. Williams Middle
Herman E. Utley Middle

Elementary schools
Grades PK-6
Amanda Rochell Elementary
Amy Parks-Heath Elementary
Billie Stevenson Elementary (2013)
Celia Hays Elementary (2007)
Cullins-Lake Pointe Elementary (1988)
Dorothy Smith Pullen Elementary (1998)
Dorris A. Jones Elementary
Grace Hartman Elementary
Howard Dobbs Elementary
Linda Lyon Elementary
Lupe Garcia Elementary 
Nebbie Williams Elementary
Ouida Springer Elementary
Sharon Shannon Elementary (2007)
Virginia Reinhardt Elementary (1985)

New Schools Under Construction
Because Rockwall is one of the fastest-growing communities in the US, Rockwall is planning for constructions of more schools.

 In February 2006, Rockwall Independent School District decided to build two more elementary schools at a cost of $31,366,862.
In addition, land acquisition in the amount of $4,830,996 for 5 new elementary sites and 1 new middle school site has begun.

Rockwall ISD District Construction

References

External links

School districts in Rockwall County, Texas
School districts in Kaufman County, Texas
School districts in Collin County, Texas
1880s establishments in Texas